Whitby Seafoods Ltd is an independent, family owned and managed business based in Whitby, North Yorkshire, England specialising in frozen seafood products coated in batter and breadcrumbs. The company claims that it is the largest scampi factory in the world, turning out more than a million portions of the seafood dish per week.

History 
Whitby Seafoods was founded in 1985 when owner, Graham Whittle bought the then defunct Whitby Shellfish Company and set out to transform the British breaded scampi industry moving premises to a  factory on the outskirts of Whitby.

Graham retired as Managing Director in October 2015 and was succeeded in the role by his son, Daniel, who alongside his sister, Laura Whittle (Sales and Marketing Director), and brother, Edward Whittle (Business Development Director) now lead the business

Acquisitions 
Whitby Seafoods acquired Middleton Seafood’s (2007) and Rockall (2011) in Kilkeel, Northern Ireland, consolidating these into Kilkeel Seafoods in 2011. Galloway Seafoods, (Newton Stewart, Scotland) from ScoFro.

Activities 
The company is the largest manufacturer of scampi in Britain, and also claims to be the largest in the world. Whitby Seafoods processes 7635 tonnes of scampi per annum with sales of £53 million in 2017. Whitby Seafoods launched its products in 20 stores of a major British supermarket in 2008. This was expanded into 700 stores of the same retailer in 2012. In 2014 Whitby Seafoods underwent a major rebranding with advertising company Big Fish, introducing Graham The Gull as mascot and the tag line ‘Bloomin Special Seafood’. New packaging emphasises a seaside feel with Beach Huts and other scenes from Whitby prominent on the packaging.

The company featured in a Channel 4 documentary, "Food Unwrapped", in June 2013.

References

External links 
 

Companies based in the Borough of Scarborough
Seafood companies of the United Kingdom
British companies established in 1985
1985 establishments in England
Whitby
Fish processing companies